Tom Hansen (born 23 September 1968) is a Canadian former biathlete who competed in the 1992 Winter Olympics.

References

1968 births
Living people
Canadian male biathletes
Olympic biathletes of Canada
Biathletes at the 1992 Winter Olympics